Bhekha is a small village 21 km from Moga district of Indian (Punjab) towards south west near Daroli Bhai.

It has a middle school and two play schools. Many students also study in different schools. It has three Gurudwaras. Bhekha is predominantly a Sidhu Brar village with few chahals, one Gill, two Dhaliwals or others.

Bhekha has a very good kabaddi team. It has Sant Prem Singh youth club which organises sports tournaments as well as a lot of community work around the village, also with the help of NRIs from (Canada, USA, New Zealand, Hong Kong, Singapore etc.) they have built a very good gym in the village.

Bhekha is a relatively trouble free village where most people still celebrate things together. Many brars (Bhekha patti) originate from langeana while babe ki patti are natives.

Barli vasti 

Villages in Moga district